Robert W. "Bob" McKnight (born May 11, 1944) is an American businessman, writer, and politician.

McKnight was born in Port Chester, New York and moved to Florida in 1948. He lived in Miami, Florida. McKnight received his bachelor's degree from Florida Southern College in 1966 and his master's degree in business administration from Florida State University in 1967. He served in the United States Army from 1968 to 1970 and was stationed in South Korea. He was involved in the real estate business with investments and management. McKnight served in the Florida House of Representatives from 1974 to 1978 and then served in the Florida Senate from 1978 to 1982. McKnight was involved with the Democratic Party. He has written books, editorial opinions, and blogs about Florida politics.

Notes

1944 births
Living people
People from Port Chester, New York
Writers from New York (state)
Businesspeople from Miami
Politicians from Miami
Writers from Miami
Military personnel from Florida
Military personnel from New York (state)
Democratic Party Florida state senators
Democratic Party members of the Florida House of Representatives